Krishna  is a major deity in Hinduism. The name comes from a Sanskrit word (कृष्ण, kṛṣṇa) that means "black", "dark", "dark blue" or “the all attractive”. He is worshipped as the eighth avatar of Vishnu and also as the Supreme god in his own right. He is the god of protection, compassion, tenderness, and love; and is one of the most popular and widely revered among Indian divinities. Krishna's birthday is celebrated every year by Hindus on Krishna Janmashtami according to the lunisolar Hindu calendar, which falls in late August or early September of the Gregorian calendar.

The anecdotes and narratives of Krishna's life are generally titled as Krishna Leela. He is a central character in the Mahabharata, the Bhagavata Purana, the Brahma Vaivarta Purana, and the Bhagavad Gita, and is mentioned in many Hindu philosophical, theological, and mythological texts. They portray him in various perspectives: as a god-child, a prankster, a model lover, a divine hero, and the universal supreme being. His iconography reflects these legends, and shows him in different stages of his life, such as an infant eating butter, a young boy playing a flute, a young boy with Radha or surrounded by female devotees; or a friendly charioteer giving counsel to Arjuna.

The name and synonyms of Krishna have been traced to 1stmillenniumBCE literature and cults. In some sub-traditions, Krishna is worshipped as Svayam Bhagavan (the Supreme God), and it is sometimes known as Krishnaism. These sub-traditions arose in the context of the medieval era Bhakti movement. Krishna-related literature has inspired numerous performance arts such as Bharatanatyam, Kathakali, Kuchipudi, Odissi, and Manipuri dance. He is a pan-Hindu god, but is particularly revered in some locations, such as Vrindavan in Uttar Pradesh, Dwarka and Junagadh in Gujarat; the Jagannatha aspect in Odisha, Mayapur in West Bengal; in the form of Vithoba in Pandharpur, Maharashtra, Shrinathji at Nathdwara in Rajasthan, Udupi Krishna in Karnataka, Parthasarathy in Tamil Nadu and in Aranmula, Kerala, and Guruvayoorappan in Guruvayoor in Kerala. Since the 1960s, the worship of Krishna has also spread to the Western world and to Africa, largely due to the work of the International Society for Krishna Consciousness (ISKCON).

Names and epithets 

The name "Krishna" originates from the Sanskrit word , which is primarily an adjective meaning "black", "dark", "dark blue" or “the all attractive”. The waning moon is called Krishna Krishna Paksha, relating to the adjective meaning "darkening". The name is also interpreted sometimes as "all-attractive".

As a name of Vishnu, Krishna is listed as the 57th name in the Vishnu Sahasranama. Based on his name, Krishna is often depicted in idols as black- or blue-skinned. Krishna is also known by various other names, epithets, and titles that reflect his many associations and attributes. Among the most common names are Mohan "enchanter"; Govinda "chief herdsman", Keev "prankster", and Gopala "Protector of the 'Go'", which means "soul" or "the cows". Some names for Krishna hold regional importance; Jagannatha, found in the Puri Hindu temple, is a popular incarnation in Odisha state and nearby regions of eastern India.

Krishna may also be referred to as Vāsudeva-Krishna, Murlidhar, or Chakradhar. The honorary title "Sri" (also spelled "Shri") is often used before the name of Krishna.

Names in different states of India 
Krishna is commonly worshipped as:
 Kanhaiyya/Bankey Bihari/Thakurji: Uttar Pradesh
 Jagannath: Odisha
 Vithoba: Maharashtra
 Shrinathji:  Rajasthan
 Guruvayoorappan/Kannan: Kerala
 Dwarakadheesh/Ranchhod: Gujarat
 Mayon/Parthasarathy/Kannan: Tamil Nadu

Historical and literary sources 
The tradition of Krishna appears to be an amalgamation of several independent deities of ancient India, the earliest to be attested being Vāsudeva. Vāsudeva was a hero-god of the tribe of the Vrishnis, belonging to the Vrishni heroes, whose worship is attested from the 5th-6th century BCE in the writings of Pāṇini, and from the 2nd century BCE in epigraphy with the Heliodorus pillar. At one point in time, it is thought that the tribe of the Vrishnis fused with the tribe of the Yadavas/Abhiras, whose own hero-god was named Krishna. Vāsudeva and Krishna fused to become a single deity, which appears in the Mahabharata, and they started to be identified with Vishnu in the Mahabharata and the Bhagavad Gita. Around the 4th century CE, another tradition, the cult of Gopala-Krishna of the Ābhīras, the protector of cattle, was also absorbed into the Krishna tradition.

Early epigraphic sources

Depiction in coinage (2nd century BCE)

Around 180 BCE, the Indo-Greek king Agathocles issued some coinage (discovered in Ai-Khanoum, Afghanistan) bearing images of deities that are now interpreted as being related to Vaisnava imagery in India. The deities displayed on the coins appear to be Saṃkarṣaṇa-Balarama with attributes consisting of the Gada mace and the plow, and Vāsudeva-Krishna with attributes of the Shankha (conch) and the Sudarshana Chakra wheel. According to Bopearachchi, the headdress on top of the deity is actually a misrepresentation of a shaft with a half-moon parasol on top (chattra).

Inscriptions

The Heliodorus Pillar, a stone pillar with a Brahmi script inscription, was discovered by colonial era archaeologists in Besnagar (Vidisha, central Indian state of Madhya Pradesh). Based on the internal evidence of the inscription, it has been dated to between 125 and 100BCE and is now known after Heliodorus – an Indo-Greek who served as an ambassador of the Greek king Antialcidas to a regional Indian king, Kasiputra Bhagabhadra. The Heliodorus pillar inscription is a private religious dedication of Heliodorus to "Vāsudeva", an early deity and another name for Krishna in the Indian tradition. It states that the column was constructed by "the Bhagavata Heliodorus" and that it is a "Garuda pillar" (both are Vishnu-Krishna-related terms). Additionally, the inscription includes a Krishna-related verse from chapter11.7 of the Mahabharata stating that the path to immortality and heaven is to correctly live a life of three virtues: self-temperance (damah), generosity (cagah or tyaga), and vigilance (apramadah). The Heliodorus pillar site was fully excavated by archaeologists in the 1960s. The effort revealed the brick foundations of a much larger ancient elliptical temple complex with a sanctum, mandapas, and seven additional pillars. The Heliodorus pillar inscriptions and the temple are among the earliest known evidence of Krishna-Vasudeva devotion and Vaishnavism in ancient India.

The Heliodorus inscription is not isolated evidence. The Hathibada Ghosundi Inscriptions, all located in the state of Rajasthan and dated by modern methodology to the 1stcenturyBCE, mention Saṃkarṣaṇa and Vāsudeva, also mention that the structure was built for their worship in association with the supreme deity Narayana. These four inscriptions are notable for being some of the oldest-known Sanskrit inscriptions.

A Mora stone slab found at the Mathura-Vrindavan archaeological site in Uttar Pradesh, held now in the Mathura Museum, has a Brahmi inscription. It is dated to the 1stcenturyCE and mentions the five Vrishni heroes, otherwise known as Saṃkarṣaṇa, Vāsudeva, Pradyumna, Aniruddha, and Samba.

The inscriptional record for Vāsudeva starts in the 2nd century BCE with the coinage of Agathocles and the Heliodorus pillar, but the name of Krishna appears rather later in epigraphy. At the Chilas II archaeological site dated to the first half of the 1st-century CE in northwest Pakistan, near the Afghanistan border, are engraved two males, along with many Buddhist images nearby. The larger of the two males held a plough and club in his two hands. The artwork also has an inscription with it in Kharosthi script, which has been deciphered by scholars as Rama-Krsna, and interpreted as an ancient depiction of the two brothers, Balarama and Krishna.

The first known depiction of the life of Krishna himself comes relatively late, with a relief found in Mathura, and dated to the 1st-2nd century CE. This fragment seems to show Vasudeva, Krishna's father, carrying baby Krishna in a basket across the Yamuna. The relief shows at one end a seven-hooded Naga crossing a river, where a makara crocodile is thrashing around, and at the other end a person seemingly holding a basket over his head.

Literary sources

Mahabharata 

The earliest text containing detailed descriptions of Krishna as a personality is the epic Mahabharata, which depicts Krishna as an incarnation of Vishnu. Krishna is central to many of the main stories of the epic. The eighteen chapters of the sixth book (Bhishma Parva) of the epic that constitute the Bhagavad Gita contain the advice of Krishna to Arjuna on the battlefield. The Harivamsa, a later appendix to the Mahabharata, contains a detailed version of Krishna's childhood and youth.

Other sources 

The Chandogya Upanishad, estimated to have been composed sometime between the 8th and 6thcenturiesBCE, has been another source of speculation regarding Krishna in ancient India. The verse (III.xvii.6) mentions Krishna in Krishnaya Devakiputraya as a student of the sage Ghor' of the Angirasa family. Ghora is identified with Neminatha, the twenty-second tirthankara in Jainism, by some scholars. This phrase, which means "To Krishna the son of Devaki", has been mentioned by scholars such as Max Müller as a potential source of fables and Vedic lore about Krishna in the Mahabharata and other ancient literature only potential because this verse could have been interpolated into the text, or the Krishna Devakiputra, could be different from the deity Krishna. These doubts are supported by the fact that the much later age Sandilya Bhakti Sutras, a treatise on Krishna, cites later age compilations such as the Narayana Upanishad but never cites this verse of the Chandogya Upanishad. Other scholars disagree that the Krishna mentioned along with Devaki in the ancient Upanishad is unrelated to the later Hindu god of the Bhagavad Gita fame. For example, Archer states that the coincidence of the two names appearing together in the same Upanishad verse cannot be dismissed easily.

Yāska's Nirukta, an etymological dictionary published around the 6thcenturyBCE, contains a reference to the Shyamantaka jewel in the possession of Akrura, a motif from the well-known Puranic story about Krishna. Shatapatha Brahmana and Aitareya-Aranyaka associate Krishna with his Vrishni origins.

In Ashṭādhyāyī, authored by the ancient grammarian Pāṇini (probably belonged to the 5th or 6thcenturyBCE), Vāsudeva and Arjuna, as recipients of worship, are referred to together in the same sutra.
Megasthenes, a Greek ethnographer and an ambassador of Seleucus I to the court of Chandragupta Maurya towards the end of 4thcenturyBCE, made reference to Herakles in his famous work Indica. This text is now lost to history, but was quoted in secondary literature by later Greeks such as Arrian, Diodorus, and Strabo. According to these texts, Megasthenes mentioned that the Sourasenoi tribe of India, who worshipped Herakles, had two major cities named Methora and Kleisobora, and a navigable river named the Jobares. According to Edwin Bryant, a professor of Indian religions known for his publications on Krishna, "there is little doubt that the Sourasenoi refers to the Shurasenas, a branch of the Yadu dynasty to which Krishna belonged". The word Herakles, states Bryant, is likely a Greek phonetic equivalent of Hari-Krishna, as is Methora of Mathura, Kleisobora of Krishnapura, and the Jobares of Jamuna. Later, when Alexander the Great launched his campaign in the northwest Indian subcontinent, his associates recalled that the soldiers of Porus were carrying an image of Herakles.

The Buddhist Pali canon and the Ghata-Jâtaka (No. 454) polemically mention the devotees of Vâsudeva and Baladeva. These texts have many peculiarities and may be a garbled and confused version of the Krishna legends. The texts of Jainism mention these tales as well, also with many peculiarities and different versions, in their legends about Tirthankaras. This inclusion of Krishna-related legends in ancient Buddhist and Jaina literature suggests that Krishna theology was existent and important in the religious landscape observed by non-Hindu traditions of ancient India.

The ancient Sanskrit grammarian Patanjali in his Mahabhashya makes several references to Krishna and his associates found in later Indian texts. In his commentary on Pāṇini's verse 3.1.26, he also uses the word Kamsavadha or the "killing of Kamsa", an important part of the legends surrounding Krishna.

Puranas
Many Puranas, mostly compiled during the Gupta period (4–5th century CE), tell Krishna's life story or some highlights from it. Two Puranas, the Bhagavata Purana and the Vishnu Purana, contain the most elaborate telling of Krishna's story, but the life stories of Krishna in these and other texts vary, and contain significant inconsistencies. The Bhagavata Purana consists of twelve books subdivided into 332chapters, with a cumulative total of between 16,000 and 18,000 verses depending on the version. The tenth book of the text, which contains about 4,000 verses (~25%) and is dedicated to legends about Krishna, has been the most popular and widely studied part of this text.

Iconography 

Krishna is represented in the Indian traditions in many ways, but with some common features. His iconography typically depicts him with black, dark, or blue skin, like Vishnu. However, ancient and medieval reliefs and stone-based arts depict him in the natural color of the material out of which he is formed, both in India and in southeast Asia. In some texts, his skin is poetically described as the color of Jambul (Jamun, a purple-colored fruit).

Krishna is often depicted wearing a peacock-feather wreath or crown, and playing the bansuri (Indian flute). In this form, he is usually shown standing with one leg bent in front of the other in the Tribhanga posture. He is sometimes accompanied by cows or a calf, which symbolise the divine herdsman Govinda. Alternatively, he is shown as a romantic young boy with the gopis (milkmaids), often making music or playing pranks.

In other icons, he is a part of battlefield scenes of the epic Mahabharata. He is shown as a charioteer, notably when he is addressing the Pandava prince Arjuna character, symbolically reflecting the events that led to the Bhagavad Gitaa scripture of Hinduism. In these popular depictions, Krishna appears in the front as the charioteer, either as a counsel listening to Arjuna or as the driver of the chariot while Arjuna aims his arrows in the battlefield of Kurukshetra.

Alternate icons of Krishna show him as a baby (Bala Krishna, the child Krishna), a toddler crawling on his hands and knees, a dancing child, or an innocent-looking child playfully stealing or consuming butter (Makkan Chor), holding Laddu in his hand (Laddu Gopal) or as a cosmic infant sucking his toe while floating on a banyan leaf during the Pralaya (the cosmic dissolution) observed by sage Markandeya. Regional variations in the iconography of Krishna are seen in his different forms, such as Jaganatha in Odisha, Vithoba in Maharashtra, Shrinathji in Rajasthan and Guruvayoorappan in Kerala.

Guidelines for the preparation of Krishna icons in design and architecture are described in medieval-era Sanskrit texts on Hindu temple arts such as Vaikhanasa agama, Vishnu dharmottara, Brihat samhita, and Agni Purana. Similarly, early medieval-era Tamil texts also contain guidelines for sculpting Krishna and Rukmini. Several statues made according to these guidelines are in the collections of the Government Museum, Chennai.

Krishna iconography forms an important element in the figural sculpture on 17th–19th century terracotta temples of Bengal. In many temples, the stories of Krishna are depicted on a long series of narrow panels along the base of the facade. In other temples, the important Krishnalila episodes are depicted on large brick panels above the entrance arches or on the walls surrounding the entrance.

Life and legends 
This summary is a mythological account, based on literary details from the Mahābhārata, the Harivamsa, the Bhagavata Purana, and the Vishnu Purana. The scenes from the narrative are set in ancient India, mostly in the present states of Uttar Pradesh, Bihar, Rajasthan, Haryana, Delhi, and Gujarat. The legends about Krishna's life are called Krishna charitas (IAST: Kṛṣṇacaritas).

Birth 

In the Krishna Charitas, Krishna is born to Devaki and her husband, Vasudeva, of the Yadava clan in Mathura. Devaki's brother is a tyrant named Kamsa. At Devaki's wedding, according to Puranic legends, Kamsa is told by fortune tellers that a child of Devaki would kill him. Sometimes, it is depicted as an akashvani announcing Kamsa's death. Kamsa arranges to kill all of Devaki's children. When Krishna is born, Vasudeva secretly carries the infant Krishna away across the Yamuna, and exchanges him with Yashoda's daughter. When Kamsa tries to kill the newborn, the exchanged baby appears as the Hindu goddess Yogamaya, warning him that his death has arrived in his kingdom, and then disappears, according to the legends in the Puranas. Krishna grows up with Nanda and his wife, Yashoda, near modern-day Mathura. Two of Krishna's siblings also survive, namely Balarama and Subhadra, according to these legends. The day of the birth of Krishna is celebrated as Krishna Janmashtami.

Childhood and youth 
The legends of Krishna's childhood and youth describe him as a cow-herder, a mischievous boy whose pranks earn him the nickname Makhan Chor (butter thief), and a protector who steals the hearts of the people in both Gokul and Vrindavana. The texts state, for example, that Krishna lifts the Govardhana hill to protect the inhabitants of Vrindavana from devastating rains and floods.

Other legends describe him as an enchanter and playful lover of the gopis (milkmaids) of Vrindavana, especially Radha. These metaphor-filled love stories are known as the Rasa lila and were romanticized in the poetry of Jayadeva, author of the Gita Govinda. They are also central to the development of the Krishna bhakti traditions worshiping Radha Krishna.

Krishna's childhood illustrates the Hindu concept of Lila, playing for fun and enjoyment and not for sport or gain. His interaction with the gopis at the rasa dance or Rasa-lila is an example. Krishna plays his flute and the gopis come immediately, from whatever they were doing, to the banks of the Yamuna River and join him in singing and dancing. Even those who could not physically be there join him through meditation. He is the spiritual essence and the love-eternal in existence, the gopis metaphorically represent the prakṛti matter and the impermanent body.

This Lila is a constant theme in the legends of Krishna's childhood and youth. Even when he is battling with a serpent to protect others, he is described in Hindu texts as if he were playing a game. This quality of playfulness in Krishna is celebrated during festivals as Rasa-Lila and Janmashtami, where Hindus in some regions such as Maharashtra playfully mimic his legends, such as by making human gymnastic pyramids to break open handis (clay pots) hung high in the air to "steal" butter or buttermilk, spilling it all over the group.

Adulthood 

Krishna legends then describe his return to Mathura. He overthrows and kills the tyrant king, his uncle Kamsa/Kansa after quelling several assassination attempts by Kamsa. He reinstates Kamsa's father, Ugrasena as the king of the Yadavas and becomes a leading prince at the court. In one version of the Krishna story, as narrated by Shanta Rao, Krishna after Kamsa's death leads the Yadavas to the newly built city of Dwaraka. Thereafter Pandavas rise. Krishna befriends Arjuna and the other Pandava princes of the Kuru kingdom. Krishna plays a key role in the Mahabharata.

The Bhagavata Purana describes eight wives of Krishna that appear in sequence as Rukmini, Satyabhama, Jambavati, Kalindi, Mitravinda, Nagnajiti (also called Satya), Bhadra and Lakshmana (also called Madra). According to Dennis Hudson, this is a metaphor where each of the eight wives signifies a different aspect of him. According to George Williams, Vaishnava texts mention all Gopis as wives of Krishna, but this is spiritual symbolism of devotional relationship and Krishna's complete loving devotion to each and everyone devoted to him.

In Krishna-related Hindu traditions, he is most commonly seen with Radha. All of his wives and his lover Radha are considered in the Hindu tradition to be the avatars of the goddess Lakshmi, the consort of Vishnu. Gopis are considered as Lakshmi's or Radha's manifestations.

Kurukshetra War and Bhagavad Gita 

According to the epic poem Mahabharata, Krishna becomes Arjuna's charioteer for the Kurukshetra War, but on the condition that he personally will not raise any weapon. Upon arrival at the battlefield and seeing that the enemies are his family, his grandfather, and his cousins and loved ones, Arjuna is moved and says his heart will not allow him to fight and kill others. He would rather renounce the kingdom and put down his Gandiva (Arjuna's bow). Krishna then advises him about the nature of life, ethics, and morality when one is faced with a war between good and evil, the impermanence of matter, the permanence of the soul and the good, duties and responsibilities, the nature of true peace and bliss and the different types of yoga to reach this state of bliss and inner liberation. This conversation between Krishna and Arjuna is presented as a discourse called the Bhagavad Gita.

Death and ascension 

It is stated in the Indian texts that the legendary Kurukshetra War led to the death of all the hundred sons of Gandhari. After Duryodhana's death, Krishna visits Gandhari to offer his condolences when Gandhari and Dhritarashtra visited Kurukshetra, as stated in Stree Parva. Feeling that Krishna deliberately did not put an end to the war, in a fit of rage and sorrow, Gandhari said, "Thou were indifferent to the Kurus and the Pandavas whilst they slew each other. Therefore, O Govinda, thou shalt be the slayer of thy own kinsmen!" According to the Mahabharata, a fight breaks out at a festival among the Yadavas, who end up killing each other. Mistaking the sleeping Krishna for a deer, a hunter named Jara shoots an arrow towards Krishna's foot that fatally injures him. Krishna forgives Jara and dies. The pilgrimage (tirtha) site of Bhalka in Gujarat marks the location where Krishna is believed to have died. It is also known as Dehotsarga, states Diana L. Eck, a term that literally means the place where Krishna "gave up his body". The Bhagavata Purana in Book 11, Chapter 31 states that after his death, Krishna returned to his transcendent abode directly because of his yogic concentration. Waiting gods such as Brahma and Indra were unable to trace the path Krishna took to leave his human incarnation and return to his abode.

Versions and interpretations 

There are numerous versions of Krishna's life story, of which three are most studied: the Harivamsa, the Bhagavata Purana, and the Vishnu Purana. They share the basic storyline but vary significantly in their specifics, details, and styles. The most original composition, the Harivamsa is told in a realistic style that describes Krishna's life as a poor herder but weaves in poetic and allusive fantasy. It ends on a triumphal note, not with the death of Krishna. Differing in some details, the fifth book of the Vishnu Purana moves away from Harivamsa realism and embeds Krishna in mystical terms and eulogies. The Vishnu Purana manuscripts exist in many versions.

The tenth and eleventh books of the Bhagavata Purana are widely considered to be a poetic masterpiece, full of imagination and metaphors, with no relation to the realism of pastoral life found in the Harivamsa. Krishna's life is presented as a cosmic play (Lila), where his youth is set as a princely life with his foster father Nanda portrayed as a king. Krishna's life is closer to that of a human being in Harivamsa, but is a symbolic universe in the Bhagavata Purana, where Krishna is within the universe and beyond it, as well as the universe itself, always. The Bhagavata Purana manuscripts also exist in many versions, in numerous Indian languages.

Chaitanya Mahaprabhu is considered as the incarnation of Krishna in Gaudiya Vaishnavism and by the ISKCON community.

Proposed datings 

The date of Krishna's birth is celebrated every year as Janmashtami.

According to Guy Beck, "most scholars of Hinduism and Indian history accept the historicity of Krishnathat he was a real male person, whether human or divine, who lived on Indian soil by at least 1000 BCE and interacted with many other historical persons within the cycles of the epic and puranic histories." Yet, Beck also notes that there is an "enormous number of contradictions and discrepancies surrounding the chronology of Krishna's life as depicted in the Sanskrit canon".

According to mythologies in the Jain tradition, Krishna was a cousin of Neminatha. Neminatha is believed in the Jain tradition to have been born 84,000 years before the 9th-centuryBCE Parshvanatha, the twenty-third tirthankara.

Philosophy and theology 

A wide range of theological and philosophical ideas are presented through Krishna in Hindu texts. The teachings of the Bhagavad Gita can be considered, according to Friedhelm Hardy, as the first Krishnaite system of theology.

Ramanuja, a Hindu theologian and philosopher whose works were influential in Bhakti movement, presented him in terms of qualified monism, or nondualism (namely Vishishtadvaita school). Madhvacharya, a philosopher whose works led to the founding of Haridasa tradition of Vaishnavism, presented Krishna in the framework of dualism (Dvaita). Bhedabhedaa group of schools, which teaches that the individual self is both different and not different from the ultimate realitypredates the positions of monism and dualism. Among medieval Bhedabheda thinkers are Nimbarkacharya, who founded the Kumara Sampradaya (Dvaitadvaita philosophical school), as well as Jiva Goswami, a saint from Gaudiya Vaishnava school, described Krishna theology in terms of Bhakti yoga and Achintya Bheda Abheda. Krishna theology is presented in a pure monism (advaita, called shuddhadvaita) framework by Vallabha Acharya, who was the founder of Pushti sect of vaishnavism. Madhusudana Sarasvati, an India philosopher, presented Krishna theology in nondualism-monism framework (Advaita Vedanta), while Adi Shankara, who is credited for unifying and establishing the main currents of thought in Hinduism, mentioned Krishna in his early eighth-century discussions on Panchayatana puja.

The Bhagavata Purana, a popular text on Krishna considered to be like scripture in Assam, synthesizes an Advaita, Samkhya, and Yoga framework for Krishna but one that proceeds through loving devotion to Krishna.  Bryant describes the synthesis of ideas in Bhagavata Purana as,

While Sheridan and Pintchman both affirm Bryant's view, the latter adds that the Vedantic view emphasized in the Bhagavata is non-dualist with a difference. In conventional nondual Vedanta, all reality is interconnected and one, the Bhagavata posits that the reality is interconnected and plural.

Across the various theologies and philosophies, the common theme presents Krishna as the essence and symbol of divine love, with human life and love as a reflection of the divine. The longing and love-filled legends of Krishna and the gopis, his playful pranks as a baby, as well as his later dialogues with other characters, are philosophically treated as metaphors for the human longing for the divine and for meaning, and the play between the universals and the human soul. Krishna's lila is a theology of love-play. According to John Koller, "love is presented not simply as a means to salvation, it is the highest life". Human love is God's love.

Other texts that include Krishna such as the Bhagavad Gita have attracted numerous bhasya (commentaries) in the Hindu traditions. Though only a part of the Hindu epic Mahabharata, it has functioned as an independent spiritual guide. It allegorically raises through Krishna and Arjuna the ethical and moral dilemmas of human life, then presents a spectrum of answers, weighing in on the ideological questions on human freedoms, choices, and responsibilities towards self and towards others. This Krishna dialogue has attracted numerous interpretations, from being a metaphor of inner human struggle teaching non-violence, to being a metaphor of outer human struggle teaching a rejection of quietism to persecution.

Influence

Vaishnavism 

The worship of Krishna is part of Vaishnavism, a major tradition within Hinduism. Krishna is considered a full avatar of Vishnu, or one with Vishnu himself. However, the exact relationship between Krishna and Vishnu is complex and diverse, with Krishna of Krishnaite sampradayas considered an independent deity and supreme. Vaishnavas accept many incarnations of Vishnu, but Krishna is particularly important. Their theologies are generally centered either on Vishnu or an avatar such as Krishna as supreme. The terms Krishnaism and Vishnuism have sometimes been used to distinguish the two, the former implying that Krishna is the transcendent Supreme Being.  Some scholars, as Friedhelm Hardy, do not define Krishnaism as a sub-order or offshoot of Vaishnavism, considering it a parallel and no less ancient current of Hinduism.

All Vaishnava traditions recognise Krishna as the eighth avatar of Vishnu; others identify Krishna with Vishnu, while Krishnaite traditions such as Gaudiya Vaishnavism, Ekasarana Dharma, Mahanam Sampraday, Nimbarka Sampradaya and the Vallabha Sampradaya regard Krishna as the Svayam Bhagavan, the original form of Lord or the same as the concept of Brahman in Hinduism. Gitagovinda of Jayadeva considers Krishna to be the supreme lord while the ten incarnations are his forms. Swaminarayan, the founder of the Swaminarayan Sampradaya, also worshipped Krishna as God himself. "Greater Krishnaism" corresponds to the second and dominant phase of Vaishnavism, revolving around the cults of the Vasudeva, Krishna, and Gopala of the late Vedic period. Today the faith has a significant following outside of India as well.

Early traditions

The deity Krishna-Vasudeva ( "Krishna, the son of Vasudeva Anakadundubhi") is historically one of the earliest forms of worship in Krishnaism and Vaishnavism. It is believed to be a significant tradition of the early history of Krishna religion in antiquity. Thereafter, there was an amalgamation of various similar traditions. These include ancient Bhagavatism, the cult of Gopala, of "Krishna Govinda" (cow-finding Krishna), of Balakrishna (baby Krishna) and of "Krishna Gopivallabha" (Krishna the lover). According to Andre Couture, the Harivamsa contributed to the synthesis of various characters as aspects of Krishna.

Already in the early Middle Ages, the Jagannathism ( Odia Vaishnavism) was origined as the cult of the god Jagannathan abstract form of Krishna. Jagannathism was a regional temple-centered version of Krishnaism, where Lord Jagannath is understood as a principal god, Purushottama and Para Brahman, but can also be regarded as a non-sectarian syncretic Vaishnavite and all-Hindu cult. According to the Vishnudharma Purana ( 4th century), Krishna is woshipped in the form of Purushottama in Odia (Odisha). The notable Jagannath temple in Puri, Odisha became particularly significant within the tradition since about 800 CE.

Bhakti tradition 

The use of the term bhakti, meaning devotion, is not confined to any one deity. However, Krishna is an important and popular focus of the devotionalism tradition within Hinduism, particularly among the Vaishnava Krishnaite sects. Devotees of Krishna subscribe to the concept of lila, meaning 'divine play', as the central principle of the universe. It is a form of bhakti yoga, one of three types of yoga discussed by Krishna in the Bhagavad Gita.

Indian subcontinent 
The bhakti movements devoted to Krishna became prominent in southern India in the 7th to 9thcenturies CE. The earliest works included those of the Alvar saints of Tamil Nadu. A major collection of their works is the Divya Prabandham. Alvar Andal's popular collection of songs Tiruppavai, in which she conceives of herself as a gopi, is the most famous of the oldest works in this genre.

The movement originated in South India during the 7th century CE, spreading northwards from Tamil Nadu through Karnataka and Maharashtra; by the 15thcentury, it was established in Bengal and northern India. Early Krishnaite Bhakti pioneers included Nimbarkacharya (12th or 13thcentury CE), but most emerged later, including Vallabhacharya (15thcentury CE) and Chaitanya Mahaprabhu. They started their own schools, namely Nimbarka Sampradaya, Vallabha Sampradaya, and Gaudiya Vaishnavism, with Krishna and Radha as the supreme gods. In addition, since the 15th century, flourished Tantric variety of Krishnaism, Vaishnava-Sahajiya, is linked to the Bengali poet Chandidas.

In the Deccan, particularly in Maharashtra, saint poets of the Warkari sect such as Dnyaneshwar, Namdev, Janabai, Eknath, and Tukaram promoted the worship of Vithoba, a local form of Krishna, from between the 13th to 18th century. Before the Warkari tradition, Krishna devotion became well established in Maharashtra due to the rise of the Mahanubhava Sampradaya founded by Sarvajna Chakradhara. The Pranami Sampradaya emerged in the 17th century in Gujarat, based on the Krishna-focussed syncretist Hindu-Islamic teachings of Devchandra Maharaj and his famous successor, Mahamati Prannath. In southern India, Purandara Dasa and Kanakadasa of Karnataka composed songs devoted to the Krishna image of Udupi. Rupa Goswami of Gaudiya Vaishnavism has compiled a comprehensive summary of bhakti called Bhakti-rasamrita-sindhu.

In South India, the acharyas of the Sri Sampradaya have written reverently about Krishna in most of their works, including the Thiruppavai by Andal and Gopala Vimshati by Vedanta Desika.

Tamil Nadu, Karnataka, Andhra Pradesh, and Kerala states have many major Krishna temples, and Janmashtami is one of the widely celebrated festivals in South India.

Outside Asia 

By 1965, the Krishna-bhakti movement had spread outside India after Bhaktivedanta Swami Prabhupada (as instructed by his guru, Bhaktisiddhanta Sarasvati Thakura) travelled from his homeland in West Bengal to New York City. A year later, in 1966, after gaining many followers, he was able to form the International Society for Krishna Consciousness (ISKCON), popularly known as the Hare Krishna movement. The purpose of this movement was to write about Krishna in English and to share the Gaudiya Vaishnava philosophy with people in the Western world by spreading the teachings of the saint Chaitanya Mahaprabhu. In the biographies of Chaitanya Mahaprabhu, the mantra he received when he was given diksha or initiation in Gaya was the six-word verse of the Kali-Santarana Upanishad, namely "Hare Krishna Hare Krishna, Krishna Krishna Hare Hare; Hare Rama Hare Rama, Rama Rama Hare Hare". In the Gaudiya tradition, it is the maha-mantra, or great mantra, about Krishna bhakti. Its chanting was known as hari-nama sankirtana.

The maha-mantra gained the attention of George Harrison and John Lennon of The Beatles fame, and Harrison produced a 1969 recording of the mantra by devotees from the London Radha Krishna Temple. Titled "Hare Krishna Mantra", the song reached the top twenty on the UK music charts and was also successful in West Germany and Czechoslovakia. The mantra of the Upanishad thus helped bring Bhaktivedanta and ISKCON ideas about Krishna into the West. ISCKON has built many Krishna temples in the West, as well as other locations such as South Africa.

Southeast Asia 

Krishna is found in Southeast Asian history and art, but to a far lesser extent than Shiva, Durga, Nandi, Agastya, and Buddha. In temples (candi) of the archaeological sites in hilly volcanic Java, Indonesia, temple reliefs do not portray his pastoral life or his role as the erotic lover, nor do the historic Javanese Hindu texts. Rather, either his childhood or the life as a king and Arjuna's companion have been more favored. The most elaborate temple arts of Krishna is found in a series of Krsnayana reliefs in the Prambanan Hindu temple complex near Yogyakarta. These are dated to the 9thcentury CE. Krishna remained a part of the Javanese cultural and theological fabric through the 14thcentury, as evidenced by the 14th-century Penataran reliefs along with those of the Hindu god Rama in east Java, before Islam replaced Buddhism and Hinduism on the island.

The medieval era arts of Vietnam and Cambodia feature Krishna. The earliest surviving sculptures and reliefs are from the 6th and 7thcenturies, and these include Vaishnavism iconography. According to John Guy, the curator and director of Southeast Asian arts at the Metropolitan Museum of Art, the Krishna Govardhana art from 6th/7th-century Vietnam at Danang, and 7th-century Cambodia at Phnom Da cave in Angkor Borei, are some of the most sophisticated of this era.

Krishna's iconography has also been found in Thailand, along with those of Surya and Vishnu. For example, a large number of sculptures and icons have been found in the SiThep and Klangnai sites in the Phetchabun region of northern Thailand. These are dated to about the 7th and 8thcenturies, from both the Funan and Zhenla period archaeological sites.

Performance arts 

Indian dance and music theatre traces its origins and techniques to the ancient Sama Veda and Natyasastra texts. The stories enacted and the numerous choreographic themes are inspired by the mythologies and legends in Hindu texts, including Krishna-related literature such as Harivamsa and Bhagavata Purana.

The Krishna stories have played a key role in the history of Indian theatre, music, and dance, particularly through the tradition of Rasaleela. These are dramatic enactments of Krishna's childhood, adolescence, and adulthood. One common scene involves Krishna playing flute in Rasa Leela, only to be heard by certain gopis (cowherd maidens), which is theologically supposed to represent divine call only heard by certain enlightened beings. Some of the text's legends have inspired secondary theatre literature such as the eroticism in Gita Govinda.

Krishna-related literature such as the Bhagavata Purana accords a metaphysical significance to the performances and treats them as a religious ritual, infusing daily life with spiritual meaning, thus representing a good, honest, happy life. Similarly, Krishna-inspired performances aim to cleanse the hearts of faithful actors and listeners. Singing, dancing, and performing any part of Krishna Lila is an act of remembering the dharma in the text, as a form of para bhakti (supreme devotion). To remember Krishna at any time and in any art, asserts the text, is to worship the good and the divine.

Classical dance styles such as Kathak, Odissi, Manipuri, Kuchipudi and Bharatanatyam in particular are known for their Krishna-related performances. Krisnattam (Krishnattam) traces its origins to Krishna legends, and is linked to another major classical Indian dance form called Kathakali. Bryant summarizes the influence of Krishna stories in the Bhagavata Purana as, "[it] has inspired more derivative literature, poetry, drama, dance, theatre and art than any other text in the history of Sanskrit literature, with the possible exception of the Ramayana.

The Palliyodam, a type of large built and used by Aranmula Parthasarathy Temple in Kerala for the annual water processions of Uthrattathi Jalamela and Valla Sadhya has the legend that it was designed by Lord Krishna and were made to look like Sheshanaga, the serpent on which Lord Vishnu rests.

Temples 

 Bankey Bihari Temple
 Radha Raman Temple
 Jagannath Temple, Puri
 Dwarkadhish Temple, Dwarka
 Vithoba Temple, Pandarpur
 Shrinathji Temple, Nathdwara
 Guruvayur Temple, Kerala
 Radha Vallabh Temple, Vrindavan
 Udupi Sri Krishna Matha
 Prem Mandir, Vrindavan
 Krishna Balaram Mandir
 Ranchodrai Temple, Dakor
 Radha Damodar Temple, Junagadh
 Radha Damodar Temple, Vrindavan
 Govind Dev Ji Temple, Jaipur
 Shree Govindajee Temple, Imphal
 Madan Mohan Temple, Karauli
 Radha Madan Mohan Temple, Vrindavan
 Dwarkadheesh temple Mathura
 Radha Madhab Temple, Bishnupur
 Krishna Janmasthan Temple Complex, Mathura
 Kantajew Temple, Bangladesh
 Swaminarayan Temples
 Shri Swaminarayan Mandir, Dholera
 Gopinathji Dev Mandir
 ISKCON Temples
 ISKCON Temple, Banglore
 ISKCON Temple, Pune
 ISKCON Temple, Delhi
 Iskcon Prabartak Sri Krishna Temple
 Vrindavan Chandrodara Mandir
 ISKCON Temple, Chennai
 Rajagopalaswamy Temple, Mannargudi
 Parthasarathy Temple, Chennai

Krishna outside of Hinduism

Jainism 
The Jainism tradition lists 63 Śalākāpuruṣa or notable figures which, amongst others, includes the twenty-four Tirthankaras (spiritual teachers) and nine sets of triads. One of these triads is Krishna as the Vasudeva, Balarama as the Baladeva, and Jarasandha as the Prati-Vasudeva. In each age of the Jain cyclic time is born a Vasudeva with an elder brother termed the Baladeva.  Between the triads, Baladeva upholds the principle of non-violence, a central idea of Jainism. The villain is the Prati-vasudeva, who attempts to destroy the world. To save the world, Vasudeva-Krishna has to forsake the non-violence principle and kill the Prati-Vasudeva. The stories of these triads can be found in the Harivamsa Purana (8thcentury CE) of Jinasena (not be confused with its namesake, the addendum to Mahābhārata) and the Trishashti-shalakapurusha-charita of Hemachandra.

The story of Krishna's life in the Puranas of Jainism follows the same general outline as those in the Hindu texts, but in details, they are very different: they include Jain Tirthankaras as characters in the story, and generally are polemically critical of Krishna, unlike the versions found in the Mahabharata, the Bhagavata Purana, and the Vishnu Purana. For example, Krishna loses battles in the Jain versions, and his gopis and his clan of Yadavas die in a fire created by an ascetic named Dvaipayana. Similarly, after dying from the hunter Jara's arrow, the Jaina texts state Krishna goes to the third hell in Jain cosmology, while his brother is said to go to the sixth heaven.

Vimalasuri is attributed to be the author of the Jain version of the Harivamsa Purana, but no manuscripts have been found that confirm this. It is likely that later Jain scholars, probably Jinasena of the 8thcentury, wrote a complete version of Krishna legends in the Jain tradition and credited it to the ancient Vimalasuri. Partial and older versions of the Krishna story are available in Jain literature, such as in the Antagata Dasao of the Svetambara Agama tradition.

In other Jain texts, Krishna is stated to be a cousin of the twenty-second Tirthankara, Neminatha. The Jain texts state that Neminatha taught Krishna all the wisdom that he later gave to Arjuna in the Bhagavad Gita. According to Jeffery D. Long, a professor of religion known for his publications on Jainism, this connection between Krishna and Neminatha has been a historic reason for Jains to accept, read, and cite the Bhagavad Gita as a spiritually important text, celebrate Krishna-related festivals, and intermingle with Hindus as spiritual cousins.

Buddhism 

The story of Krishna occurs in the Jataka tales in Buddhism. The Vidhurapandita Jataka mentions Madhura (Sanskrit: Mathura), the Ghata Jataka mentions Kamsa, Devagabbha (Sk: Devaki), Upasagara or Vasudeva, Govaddhana (Sk: Govardhana), Baladeva (Balarama), and Kanha or Kesava (Sk: Krishna, Keshava).

Like the Jaina versions of the Krishna legends, the Buddhist versions such as one in Ghata Jataka follow the general outline of the story, but are different from the Hindu versions as well. For example, the Buddhist legend describes Devagabbha (Devaki) to have been isolated in a palace built upon a pole after she is born, so no future husband could reach her. Krishna's father similarly is described as a powerful king, but who meets up with Devagabbha anyway, and to whom Kamsa gives away his sister Devagabbha in marriage. The siblings of Krishna are not killed by Kamsa, though he tries. In the Buddhist version of the legend, all of Krishna's siblings grow to maturity.

Krishna and his siblings' capital becomes Dvaravati. The Arjuna and Krishna interaction is missing in the Jataka version. A new legend is included, wherein Krishna laments in uncontrollable sorrow when his son dies, and a Ghatapandita feigns madness to teach Krishna a lesson. The Jataka tale also includes internecine destruction among his siblings after they all get drunk. Krishna also dies in the Buddhist legend by the hand of a hunter named Jara, but while he is traveling to a frontier city. Mistaking Krishna for a pig, Jara throws a spear that fatally pierces his feet, causing Krishna great pain and then his death.

At the end of this Ghata-Jataka discourse, the Buddhist text declares that Sariputta, one of the revered disciples of the Buddha in the Buddhist tradition, was incarnated as Krishna in his previous life to learn lessons on grief from the Buddha in his prior rebirth:

While the Buddhist Jataka texts co-opt Krishna-Vasudeva and make him a student of the Buddha in his previous life, the Hindu texts co-opt the Buddha and make him an avatar of Vishnu. In Chinese Buddhism, Taoism and Chinese folk religion, the figure of Krishna has been amalgamated and merged with that of Nalakuvara to influence the formation of the god Nezha, who has taken on iconographic characteristics of Krishna such as being presented as a divine god-child and slaying a nāga in his youth.

Other 

Krishna is mentioned as "Krishna Avtar" in the Chaubis Avtar, a composition in Dasam Granth traditionally and historically attributed to Sikh Guru Gobind Singh.

Within the Sikh-derived 19th-century Radha Soami movement, the followers of its founder Shiv Dayal Singh used to consider him the Living Master and incarnation of God (Lord Krishna/Vishnu).

Baháʼís believe that Krishna was a "Manifestation of God", or one in a line of prophets who have revealed the Word of God progressively for a gradually maturing humanity. In this way, Krishna shares an exalted station with Abraham, Moses, Zoroaster, Buddha, Muhammad, Jesus, the Báb, and the founder of the Baháʼí Faith, Bahá'u'lláh.

Ahmadiyya, a 20th-century Islamic movement, consider Krishna as one of their ancient prophets. Ghulam Ahmad stated that he was himself a prophet in the likeness of prophets such as Krishna, Jesus, and Muhammad, who had come to earth as a latter-day reviver of religion and morality.

Krishna worship or reverence has been adopted by several new religious movements since the 19thcentury, and he is sometimes a member of an eclectic pantheon in occult texts, along with Greek, Buddhist, biblical, and even historical figures. For instance, Édouard Schuré, an influential figure in perennial philosophy and occult movements, considered Krishna a Great Initiate, while Theosophists regard Krishna as an incarnation of Maitreya (one of the Masters of the Ancient Wisdom), the most important spiritual teacher for humanity along with Buddha.

Krishna was canonised by Aleister Crowley and is recognised as a saint of Ecclesia Gnostica Catholica in the Gnostic Mass of Ordo Templi Orientis.

Explanatory notes

References

Citations

General and cited ources 

 
 
 
 
 
 
 
 
 
 
 
 
 
 
 
 
 
 
 
 
 
 
 
 The Mahabharata of Krishna-Dwaipayana Vyasa, translated by Kisari Mohan Ganguli, published between 1883 and 1896
 The Vishnu-Purana, translated by H. H. Wilson, (1840)
 The Srimad Bhagavatam, translated by A.C. Bhaktivedanta Swami Prabhupada, (1988) copyright Bhaktivedanta Book Trust
 
 The Jataka or Stories of the Buddha's Former Births, edited by E. B. Cowell, (1895)
 
 
 
 Garuda Pillar of Besnagar, Archaeological Survey of India, Annual Report (1908–1909). Calcutta: Superintendent of Government Printing, 1912, 129.
 
 
 
 
 
 
 
 
 
 
 
 History of Indian Theatre By M. L. Varadpande. Chapter Theatre of Krishna, pp. 231–94. Published 1991, Abhinav Publications, .

Further reading

External links 

Akilattirattu Ammanai
Avatars of Vishnu
Ayyavazhi mythology
Creator gods
Characters in the Bhagavata Purana
Characters in the Mahabharata
Commerce gods
Destroyer gods
Flautists
Forms of Vishnu
Fortune gods
Heroes in mythology and legend
Hindu eschatology
Hindu given names
Hindu gods
 
Life-death-rebirth gods
Love and lust gods
Men centenarians
Miracle workers
Names of God in Hinduism
People from Mathura
Puranic chronology
Salakapurusa
Savior gods
Self-declared messiahs
Vaishnavism
Wisdom gods
Year of birth uncertain
Year of death uncertain